Mann Kasturi Re is an 2022 Indian Marathi-language suspense romantic drama film directed by Sanket Mane and produced by Mumbai Movie Studios, Imens Dimension Entertainment, and Arts Production. It stars Abhinay Berde and Tejasswi Prakash, in her Marathi cinema debut.
The film focuses on two very different people—Shruti and Siddhant—who fall in love, subsequently changing the trajectory of their lives.

Cast and characters
 Tejasswi Prakash as Shruti Sarnaik
 Abhinay Berde as Siddhant Sawant
 Rajshri Deshpande as Siddhant's lawyer
 Asit Redij as Shruti's father
 Veena Jamkar as Siddhant's mother
 Vinambra Babhal as Siddhant's friend
 Kiran Tambe as Shruti's friend
 Aadarsh Swaroop as a prisoner
 Tushar Ghadiagaonkar as Siddhant's friend
 Ajit Bhure as Shruti's lawyer

Release
The trailer for Mann Kasturi Re was released on 17 October 2022 on YouTube, and the film came out in theatres on 4 November 2022.

Reception
Mann Kasturi Re received mixed reviews from critics. Harshada Bhirvandekar of Hindustan Times rated it 2.5 out of five and wrote, "The first half of the film seems a bit boring. However, it is successful at keeping the audience hooked in the second half".

Vinit Vaidya of ABP Majha gave it a rating of 2.5 and wrote, "The movie has a star cast in the lead role, and audiences will get to see a lot of suspense and twists in this movie. The background score, cinematography, and art department have done a great job. When the core of the movie includes various entanglements, the ending can expected to be a mystery, but it turns out to be disappointing".

Shruti Shrivastava of DNA India wrote, "The film has an average storyline, and you will be disappointed if you are hoping for a fresh story. It can be sluggish at times as the story becomes predictable".

References

External links
 

2020s Marathi-language films